The Miami International Four-Ball was a golf tournament on the PGA Tour from 1924 to 1954. It was played primarily at what is now the Miami Springs Golf and Country Club in Miami, Florida. It was also played at the Miami Biltmore Golf Course in Coral Gables, Florida from 1939 to 1942 and at the Normandy Shore Club in Miami Beach, Florida from 1952 to 1954.

It was played with eight two-man teams in single elimination match play initially. It went to 16 teams in 1926 and to 32 teams in 1950. In 1954, 40 teams played in a  72-hole stroke play format.

Winners
Miami Beach International Four-Ball
1954 Tommy Bolt and Dick Mayer
1953 No tournament
1952 Ted Kroll and Lew Worsham
1951 No tournament

Miami International Four-Ball
1950 Pete Cooper and Claude Harmon
1949 Jim Ferrier and Cary Middlecoff
1948 Jim Ferrier and Cary Middlecoff
1947 Jimmy Demaret and Ben Hogan
1946 Jimmy Demaret and Ben Hogan
1945 Harold "Jug" McSpaden and Byron Nelson
1943-44 No tournament due to World War II

Miami Biltmore International Four-Ball
1942 Chandler Harper and Herman Keiser
1941 Ben Hogan and Gene Sarazen
1940 Billy Burke and Craig Wood
1939 Ralph Guldahl and Sam Snead

Miami International Four-Ball
1938 Ky Laffoon and Dick Metz
1937 Henry Picard and Johnny Revolta
1936 Henry Picard and Johnny Revolta
1935 Henry Picard and Johnny Revolta
1934 Al Espinosa and Denny Shute
1933 Paul Runyan and Horton Smith
1932 Tommy Armour and Ed Dudley
1931 Wiffy Cox and Willie Macfarlane
1930 Clarence Gamber and Cyril Walker
1929 Leo Diegel and Walter Hagen
1928 Johnny Farrell and Gene Sarazen
1927 Tommy Armour and Bobby Cruickshank
1926 Bill Mehlhorn and Macdonald Smith
1925 Bobby Cruickshank and Johnny Farrell
1924 Bill Mehlhorn and Macdonald Smith

External links
Miami Springs Golf and Country Club
Miami Springs Golf Course history - see page 7
Miami Biltmore Golf Course

Former PGA Tour events
Golf in Florida
Sports in Miami
Recurring sporting events established in 1924
Recurring sporting events disestablished in 1954
1924 establishments in Florida
1954 disestablishments in Florida